"She Said" is a song by American post-grunge band Collective Soul. It was featured in the 1997 slasher film Scream 2 during the closing credits as well as on its accompanying soundtrack. A music video was released for the song featuring scenes from the film.  

A slightly different version of the song was later featured as a hidden track on the band's fourth studio album Dosage.

Charts

References

1997 songs
1998 singles
Atlantic Records singles
Collective Soul songs
Songs written for films
Songs written by Ed Roland